Thomas King  (born April 24, 1943) is a Canadian writer and broadcast presenter who most often writes about First Nations.

Early life and education
Thomas King, who was born in Roseville, California, on April 24, 1943, claims German and Greek descent from his mother and unconfirmed and not tribally recognized Cherokee descent from his father.  King says his father left the family when the boys were very young, and that they were raised almost entirely by their mother. In his series of Massey Lectures, eventually published as a book The Truth About Stories (2003), King tells that after their father's death, he and his brother learned that their father had two other families, neither of whom knew about the third.

As a child, King attended grammar school in Roseville, California, and both private Catholic and public high schools. After flunking out of Sacramento State University, he joined the US Navy for a brief period of time before receiving a medical discharge for a knee injury. Following this, King worked several jobs, including as an ambulance driver, bank teller, and photojournalist in New Zealand for three years.

King eventually completed bachelor's and master's degrees from Chico State University in California. He moved to Utah, where he worked as a counselor for American Indian students before completing a PhD program in English at the University of Utah. His 1971 MA thesis was on film studies. His 1986 PhD dissertation was on Native American studies, one of the earliest works to explore the oral storytelling tradition as literature. Around this time, King became interested in American Indian oral traditions and storytelling.

After moving to Canada in 1980, King taught Native studies at the University of Lethbridge (Alberta) in the early 1980s. He also served as a faculty member of the University of Minnesota's American Indian studies department. He is currently an English professor at the University of Guelph (Ontario) and lives in Guelph.

King was chosen to deliver the 2003 Massey Lectures, entitled The Truth About Stories: A Native Narrative. King was the first Massey lecturer of self-identifying aboriginal descent. King explored the Native experience in oral stories, literature, history, religion and politics, popular culture and social protest in order to make sense of North America's relationship with its aboriginal peoples.

Activism
King has criticized policies and programs of both the United States and Canadian governments in many interviews and books. He is worried about aboriginal prospects and rights in North America. He says that he fears that aboriginal culture, and specifically aboriginal land, will continue to be taken away from aboriginal peoples until there is nothing left for them at all. In his 2013 book The Inconvenient Indian, King says, "The issue has always been land. It will always be land, until there isn't a square foot of land left in North America that is controlled by Native people."

King also discusses policies regarding aboriginal status. He noted that legislatures in the 1800s in the United States and Canada withdrew aboriginal status from persons who graduated from university or joined the army. King has also worked to identify North American laws that make it complicated to claim status in the first place, for example, the US Indian Arts and Crafts Act of 1990 or Canada's 1985 Bill C-31. Bill C-31 amended the Indian Act in 1985 to allow aboriginal women and their children to reclaim status, which the Act had previously withdrawn if the woman married a non-status man. King claims that the amended act, though progressive for women who had lost their status, threatens the status of future generations because of its limitations.

Writings
King has been writing novels, and children's books, and collections of stories since the 1980s. His notable works include A Coyote Columbus Story (1992) and Green Grass, Running Water (1993) – both of which were nominated for a Governor General's Award (the former for children's literature, and the latter for fiction – and The Inconvenient Indian: A Curious Account of Native People in North America (2012), which won the 2014 RBC Taylor Prize.

King's writing style incorporates oral storytelling structures with traditional Western narrative. He writes in a conversational tone; for example, in Green Grass, Running Water, the narrator argues with some of the characters. In The Truth About Stories (2003), King addresses the reader as if in a conversation with responses. King uses a variety of anecdotes and humorous narratives while maintaining a serious message in a way that has been compared to the style of trickster legends in Native American culture. Within this story, King also integrates the recently popularized idea of turtles all the way down in an anecdote introducing this narrative, calling into the relevancy of this ideology in American and Native American history.

Politics
In April 2007 King announced that he would seek the New Democratic Party (NDP) nomination for Guelph district. On March 30, 2007, he was named the NDP candidate. NDP leader Jack Layton was present at the nomination meeting. A by-election was called in the riding due to the resignation of incumbent Liberal Member of Parliament Brenda Chamberlain, effective April 7, 2008. Scheduled for September 8, 2008, the by-election was cancelled with the calling of the October 14, 2008 federal general election. King finished fourth behind Liberal candidate Frank Valeriote, Conservative candidate Gloria Kovach, and Green candidate Mike Nagy.

Other work
In the 1990s, he served as story editor for Four Directions,  a CBC Television drama anthology series about First Nations which was held up by production and scheduling delays before finally airing in 1996. He also wrote the teleplay "Borders", an adaptation of his own previously published short story, for the series.

From 1997 to 2000, King wrote and acted in a CBC radio show, The Dead Dog Café Comedy Hour, which featured a fictitious town and a fictitious radio program hosted by three First Nations characters. Elements were adapted from his novel, Green Grass, Running Water. The broadcast was a political and social satire with dark humour and mocking stereotypes.

In July 2007, King made his directorial debut with I'm Not the Indian You Had in Mind, a short film which he wrote.

In 2020, his book The Inconvenient Indian was adapted by Michelle Latimer as a documentary film, Inconvenient Indian.

Personal life
His partner is Helen Hoy, a professor emerita of English and Women's Studies at the University of Guelph, School of English and Theatre Studies. She has written a study, How Should I Read These? Native Women Writers in Canada, (2001). He has three children, Christian (born 1971),  Benjamin (born 1985) and  Elizabeth (born 1988). The couple resides in Guelph, Ontario.

As of 2020, King was listed as Professor (retired), Professor Emeritus,
School of English and Theatre Studies by the University of Guelph.

A news item in November 2020 stated that King "self-identifies as being of Cherokee and Greek ancestry...".

Works

Books
 Medicine River (Viking Canada, 1990), novel
 A Coyote Columbus Story (Douglas & McIntyre, 1992), illustrated by William Kent Monkman – Governor General's Award finalist
 Green Grass, Running Water (Houghton Mifflin, 1993), novel featuring Coyote,  – Governor General's Award finalist
 One Good Story, That One (1993), stories
 Borders (1993)
 Coyote Sings to the Moon (1998), illus. Johnny Wales
 Truth and Bright Water (HarperFlamingo Canada, 1999)
 The Truth About Stories (House of Anansi Press, 2003); US edition The Truth About Stories: a native narrative (U. of Minnesota Press, 2005) – Massey Lectures
 Coyote's New Suit (2004), illus. Johnny Wales
 A Short History of Indians in Canada (HarperCollins, 2005), stories – McNally Robinson Award winner
 A Coyote Solstice Tale (Groundwood Books, 2009), illus. Gary Clement
 The Inconvenient Indian: a curious account of native people in North America (Doubleday Canada, 2012)
 The Back of the Turtle (Doubleday, 2014) – Governor General's Award winner
 Indians on Vacation (2020)
 Sufferance (2021)

DreadfulWater Mysteries
 Dreadful Water Shows Up (2002), published under the pen name Hartley GoodWeather (reprinted 2017 as DreadfulWater, as author Thomas King)
 The Red Power Murders (2006), as Hartley GoodWeather (reprinted 2017, as author Thomas King )
 Cold Skies (2018)
 A Matter of Malice (2019)
 Obsidian (2020)
 Deep House (2022)

As editor
 The Native in Literature (1987)
 An Anthology of Short Fiction by Native Writers in Canada (1988)
 All My Relations: an anthology of contemporary Canadian native fiction (Toronto: McClelland & Stewart, 1990)

Selected short stories
Short story collections are listed above.
 "Coyote and the Enemy Aliens" (HarperCollins, 2012), ebook,

Scripts
 Four Directions (CBC Television, 1996), drama anthology series, as editor and sometime writer 
 The Dead Dog Café Comedy Hour (CBC Radio, 1997 to 2000) and its sequels (2002 and 2006)
 I'm Not The Indian You Had In Mind, 2007, short film also directed by King

Awards and recognition
 Nominated for a Governor General's Award in 1992 for A Coyote Columbus Story.
 Nominated for a Governor General's Award in 1993 for Green Grass, Running Water.
 Selected in 2003 to give the Canadian Broadcasting Corporation (CBC) Massey Lectures. The series, entitled The Truth About Stories, was published that year by the House of Anansi Press.
 Green Grass, Running Water was chosen for the inclusion in the 2004 edition of Canada Reads, and championed by then-Winnipeg mayor Glen Murray. In the 2015 edition of Canada Reads, his non-fiction book The Inconvenient Indian was defended by activist Craig Kielburger.
 In 2004, King was made a Member of the Order of Canada.
 A Short History of Indians in Canada won the 2006 McNally Robinson Aboriginal Book of the Year Award.
 The Inconvenient Indian won the 2014 RBC Taylor Prize, and was a finalist for the 2013 Hilary Weston Writers' Trust Prize for Nonfiction and the 2014 Burt Award for First Nations, Métis and Inuit Literature.
 The Back of the Turtle won the Governor General's Award for English-language fiction at the 2014 Governor General's Awards.
 Indians on Vacation was shortlisted for the Rogers Writers' Trust Fiction Prize, and for the Governor General's Award for English-language fiction at the 2020 Governor General's Awards.
 In November 2020, King was named a Companion of the Order of Canada.  He had been named a Member of the Order of Canada six years earlier. The naming was because of King's "enduring contributions to the preservation and recognition of indigenous culture, as one of North America’s most acclaimed literary figures".
 Won the Stephen Leacock Memorial Medal for Humour in 2021 for Indians on Vacation

Electoral record

See also

List of writers from peoples indigenous to the Americas
Native American Studies
2008 Canadian federal by-elections

References

Citations
W. H. New. Encyclopedia of Literature in Canada. Toronto: University of Toronto Press, 2002. 577–80.

Further reading
 Eva Gruber, ed. Thomas King: Works and Impact. Rochester, NY: Camden House, 2012.

External links
 
 Hartley GoodWeather (pseudonym) at LC Authorities, with 2 records
 Archives of Thomas King (Thomas King, R15938) are held at Library and Archives Canada

1943 births
Living people
20th-century American novelists
Canadian male novelists
Companions of the Order of Canada
Writers from California
American expatriate academics
American expatriate writers in Canada
Canadian people of Cherokee descent
Canadian people of Greek descent
Canadian people of German descent
New Democratic Party candidates for the Canadian House of Commons
Ontario candidates for Member of Parliament
21st-century American novelists
Academic staff of the University of Guelph
Governor General's Award-winning fiction writers
American male novelists
Canadian male screenwriters
20th-century Canadian novelists
21st-century Canadian novelists
Indspire Awards
University of Utah alumni
PEN Oakland/Josephine Miles Literary Award winners
20th-century Canadian male writers
21st-century Canadian male writers
Canadian social commentators
20th-century American male writers
21st-century American male writers
Stephen Leacock Award winners
21st-century Canadian screenwriters